The Dashboard of Sustainability is a free-of-charge, non-commercial software package configured to convey the complex relationships among economic, social, and environmental issues.
The software is designed to help developing countries achieve the Millennium Development Goals and work towards sustainable development. The software package was developed by members of the Consultative Group on Sustainable Development Indicators (CGSDI), and has been applied to quite a number of indicator sets, inter alia to the Millennium Development Goals indicators and the United Nations Commission on Sustainable Development indicators.

In 2002, Dashboard of Sustainability researchers Jochen Jesinghaus and Peter Hardi presented the Dashboard of Sustainability at the Johannesburg Summit and the 2002 World Social Forum in Porto Alegre. It was also included in the resources for the OECD World Forum on Key Indicators.

In January 2006, the Millennium Project utilized the Dashboard of Sustainability to conclude in their "State of the Future" report that global prospects for improving the overall health, wealth, and sustainability of humanity are improving, but slowly.  In February 2006, it was proposed that the Dashboard of Sustainability be utilized to combine and represent two or more of the following five frameworks presently used for developing sustainability indicators: domain-based, goal-based, issue-based, sectoral, and causal frameworks.

Known applications (external links) 

Translating a spreadsheet into a dashboard is relatively straightforward, see The Manual, and numerous indicator sets have been translated into the dashboard format. While many of them are not publicly available, the following applications have been put online by their authors.

Applications with global scope 
Millennium Development Goals Indicators Dashboard - see screenshot to the right and the online demo 

Sustainable Development Indicators Dashboard (UN CSD set)

UNESCO/SCOPE Policy brief on Sustainable Development 

Maternal and Neonatal Program Effort index (MNPI)

Applications with national scope 

 Australia: National Land & Water Resources Audit, Sydney Regional Innovation Dashboard
 Azores regional dashboard
 Brazil: National multiannual plan (Plano Plurianual, PPA), Rural sustainability,  Lages, Mato Grosso
 Greece regional dashboard
 India/West Bengal Monitoring of Public Health Progress
 Italy: Sicily waste management, agriculture indicators, Bienno, Bologna’s Ecological Footprint, Ecosistema Urbano, Padua, Liguria, Regional wellbeing indices, Varese PTCP

 Estonian National Strategy on Sustainable Development and Estonian regional dashboards
 Switzerland Regional Dashboard
 Tanzania Districts Dashboard
 Sustainable Development in the United States: An Experimental Set of Indicators

External links
 Dashboard of Sustainability: a free, non-commercial software which allows to present complex relationships between economic, social and environmental issues in a highly communicative format aimed at decision-makers and citizens interested in Sustainable Development.
MDG Dashboard: Millennium Development Indicators: download page for the latest version of the software, updated in September 2014 (note that running the executable requires a Virtual Machine with a 32-bit Windows client).

References

Science software for Windows
Sustainable development
Environmental science software